List of GMTV presenters and reporters shows the on air team for the various shows broadcast by GMTV on ITV between 1 January 1993 and 3 September 2010. At this point GMTV was replaced by ITV Breakfast and Daybreak was launched, with new shows and presenters.

Presenters

Programme presenters

Newsreaders

Weather presenters

Sport presenters

Children's presenters

Guest presenters

Correspondents and reporters

Experts

References

External links
GMTV
itv.com

Presenters
GMTV

fr:GMTV
nl:GMTV